Home for the Holidays may refer to:

Film and television
 Home for the Holidays (1972 film), an American television slasher film
 Home for the Holidays (1995 film), an American film directed by Jodie Foster
 Home for the Holidays, a 2017 holiday special of the TV series Home: Adventures with Tip & Oh
 "Home for the Holidays" (Home Improvement), a 1998 television episode
 "Home for the Holidays" (Roseanne), a 1996 television episode

Music

Albums
 Home for the Holidays (Anthony Hamilton album) or the title song, 2014
 Home for the Holidays (Darius Rucker album), 2014
 Home for the Holidays (Glen Campbell album), 1993
 Home for the Holidays (Lynn Anderson album), 1999
 Home for the Holidays (Mormon Tabernacle Choir album), 2013
 Home for the Holidays (Point of Grace album), 2010
 Home for the Holidays, by LVRN, with 6lack and Summer Walker, 2020

Songs
 "Home for the Holidays" (song), a 1954 song popularized by Perry Como
 "Home for the Holidays", a song by Destiny's Child from 8 Days of Christmas, 2001